Rishpon is a moshav in the Central District of Israel. Located in the Sharon plain near Herzliya, it falls under the jurisdiction of Hof HaSharon Regional Council.

The moshav was established in 1936. Its original proposed name by the name committee, Rishpona, is an artificial reconstruction of the supposed ancient name of Arsuf, based on a misreading of an Assyrian inscription. The current name was chosen by its residents, and has similar elements.

Notable people
Meir Har-Zion (1934–2014), military commando

References

External links

Official website 

Moshavim
Populated places established in 1936
1936 establishments in Mandatory Palestine
Populated places in Central District (Israel)